Johanna Hageman [Hargraves] (December 17, 1918 – February 10, 1984) was a first base player and chaperone in All-American Girls Professional Baseball League between the  and  seasons.

Born in Chicago, Illinois, Johanna Hageman was one of the sixty original members of the All-American Girls Professional Baseball League. The circuit operated from 1943 through 1954 and started with four teams: the Racine Belles and the Kenosha Comets, both from Wisconsin; the Rockford Peaches from Illinois, and the South Bend Blue Sox from Indiana. League play officially began on May 30, 1943 and each team was made up of fifteen girls.

In the inaugural season, Hageman was the best fielder at first base while playing for the Blue Sox. She compiled a .983 average, after committing only 21 errors in 1,178 fielding chances. She also hit .225 with a .319 on-base percentage and a .295 slugging in 108 games, ending third in the league for the most doubles (10), sixth in runs batted in (45) and tenth in hits (85).

In 1944, Hageman batted just .142 in a career-high 116 games, but kept her good defense at first with a .982 mark. The next season she was traded to Kenosha and slumped to .117 in 96 games, even though she posted a .983 fielding average. She went on to play four more seasons with Kenosha from 1946 through 1949.

Hageman died in Chicago, Illinois at the age of 65.

Career statistics
Batting

Fielding

References

External links
"Betty Fabac with Chaperone Johanna Hageman Photograph, between 1945 and 1948" . National Baseball Hall of Fame. Retrieved 2019-04-14.
"Kenosha Comets Rookies Photograph, 1948 May 8". National Baseball Hall of Fame. Retrieved 2019-04-14.

All-American Girls Professional Baseball League players
South Bend Blue Sox players
Kenosha Comets players
1918 births
1984 deaths
Baseball players from Chicago
20th-century American women
20th-century American people